David Hay Petrie (16 July 1895 – 30 July 1948) was a Scottish actor noted for playing eccentric characters, among them Quilp in The Old Curiosity Shop (1934), the McLaggen in The Ghost Goes West (1935) and Uncle Pumblechook in Great Expectations (1946).

Hay Petrie was born in Dundee, Angus, Scotland, where he went to Harris Academy. He later attended St Andrew's University, where he first discovered the stage. In 1915, he joined the Royal Scots (Lothian Regiment) as a second lieutenant.

After the war, he studied with Rosina Filippi joining the Old Vic Company appearing as "Starveling" in A Midsummer Night's Dream in 1920. In 1924 Albert de Courville brought Hay Petrie into vaudeville with The Looking Glass, in which he sang "Oh Shakespeare you're the best of all but you can't fill the fourteen shilling stall". His first film part was Many Waters in 1931.

Hay Petrie struggled with alcoholism, but was much loved by audiences and players. He was never more at home than when he was playing parts from the classical theatre, and for many he was the Shakespearean Clown of the early 1920s.

He died in London in July 1948, aged 53.

Filmography 

 Suspense (1930) as Scruffy (film debut)
 Night Birds (1931) as Scotty
 Many Waters (1931) as Director
 Carmen (1931) as Remenado
 Help Yourself (1932) as Sam Short
 The Lucky Number (1932) as The Photographer
 The Private Life of Henry VIII (1933) as The King's Barber (uncredited)
 The Wandering Jew (1933) as Palermo Merchant (uncredited)
 Song of the Plough (1933) as Farmhand
 Crime on the Hill (1933) as Jevons
 Red Wagon (1933) as Minor Role (uncredited)
 Matinee Idol (1933) as Mr. Clappit
 Colonel Blood (1934) as Mr. Edwards
 The Queen's Affair (1934) as Revolutionary
 Nell Gwynn (1934) as French Ambassador (uncredited)
 The Private Life of Don Juan (1934) as Golden Pheasant Manager (uncredited)
 Blind Justice (1934) as Harry
 The Old Curiosity Shop (1934) as Quilp
 Peg of Old Drury (1935) as Mr. Rich
 The Loves of Madame Dubarry (1935) as Cascal
 Koenigsmark (1935) as Professor (uncredited)
 Moscow Nights (1935) as Spy
 The Ghost Goes West (1935) as The McLaggen
 Invitation to the Waltz (1935) as Periteau
 Forget Me Not (1936) as New York Theatre Manager
 Men of Yesterday (1936)
 The House of the Spaniard (1936) as Orlando
 Hearts of Humanity (1936) as Alf Hooper
 Rembrandt (1936) as Jeweller (uncredited)
 Treachery on the High Seas (1936) as Brainie
 Conquest of the Air (1936) as Tiberius Cavallo
 Secret Lives (1937) as Robert Pigeon
 Knight Without Armour (1937) as Station Master
 The Last Barricade (1938) as Captain MacTavish
 Keep Smiling (1938) as Jack
 A Spot of Bother (1938) as McTavish the Golf Club Official (uncredited)
 Q Planes (1939) as Stage Door Keeper
 Trunk Crime (1939) as Old Dan
 The Four Feathers (1939) as Mahdi Interpreter (uncredited)
 Jamaica Inn (1939) as Sam - Sir Humphrey's Groom
 The Spy in Black (1939) as Engineer
 Inquest (1939) as Norman Neale K.C.
 21 Days (1940) as Evan
 Contraband (1940) as Axel Skold/Erik Skold
 Crimes at the Dark House (1940) as Dr. Isidor Fosco
 Spy for a Day (1940) as Mr. Britt.
 Pastor Hall (1940) as Nazi Pastor
 Ten Days in Paris (1940) as Benoit
 Convoy (1940) as Minesweeper Skipper
 The Thief of Bagdad (1940) as Astrologer
 Freedom Radio (1941) as Sebastian
 The Ghost of St. Michael's (1941) as Procurator Fiscal
 Quiet Wedding (1941) as Railway Porter (uncredited)
 Spellbound (1941) as Mr. Cathcart
 Turned Out Nice Again (1941) as Drunk (uncredited)
 Cottage to Let (1941) as Dr. Truscott
 Rush Hour (1941, Short) as Bus Conductor (uncredited)
 This Was Paris (1942) as Popinard, Amusement Park Owner
 One of Our Aircraft Is Missing (1942) as The Burgomaster
 Hard Steel (1942) as Mr. Kissack
 They Flew Alone (1942) as Old General
 Those Kids from Town (1942) as Ted Roberts
 Sabotage at Sea (1942) as Talkative sailor at table
 The Great Mr. Handel (1942) as Phineas
 Escape to Danger (1943) (uncredited)
 Schweik's New Adventures (1943) as Gestapo man at inn
 They Met in the Dark (1943) as Waiter (uncredited)
 The Shipbuilders (1943) as Worker in Pagan's Office (uncredited)
 Battle for Music (1943) as Official Receiver
 On Approval (1944) as Hotelkeeper
 A Canterbury Tale (1944) as Woodcock
 Kiss the Bride Goodbye (1945) as Fraser
 For You Alone (1945) as Sir Henry Markham (uncredited)
 Waltz Time (1945) as Minister of War
 The Voice Within (1946) as Fair Owner
 Night Boat to Dublin (1946) as Station Master
 Under New Management (1946) as The Bridegroom
 The Laughing Lady (1946) as Tom
 Great Expectations (1946) as Uncle Pumblechook
 The Red Shoes (1948) as Boisson
 The Dark Road (1948)
 The Fallen Idol (1948) as Clock Winder
 Noose (1948) as Barber
 The Guinea Pig (1948) as Peck
 The Monkey's Paw (1948) as Grimshaw, Curio Shopkeeper
 The Queen of Spades (1949) as Herman's servant (final film)

References

External links 

1895 births
1948 deaths
Scottish male film actors
20th-century Scottish male actors
Male actors from Dundee
People educated at Harris Academy
British Army personnel of World War I
Royal Scots officers